Events from the year 1948 in Michigan.

Top stories
The Associated Press polled editors of its member newspapers in Michigan and ranked the state's top news stories of 1948 as follows:
 The November 2 election of G. Mennen Williams as Governor in an upset over Kim Sigler (354 points)
 The April 20 shooting of Walter Reuther with a shotgun blast through his kitchen window (333 points)
 Crusades of Michigan Attorney General Eugene F. Black and his feud with Governor Sigler (232 points)
 Historic wage agreement between the CIO-UAW and General Motors with a sliding pay scale tied to the cost of living (195 points)
 1948 Michigan Wolverines football team is undefeated and ranked No. 1 in final AP Poll (171 points)
 The December raid by 300 union men on strike-bound plants of Shakespeare Company in Kalamazoo (158 points)
 Federal prosecution of Michigan automobile dealers (84 points)
 Arrest of James Tamer and ice hockey betting scandal (59 points)
 The April 27 death of William S. Knudsen, a former Ford executive who served as a general in World War II and helped lead the country's efforts to produce war materials (58 points)
 The spring strike by 75,000 Chrysler workers (56 points)

Office holders

State office holders
 Governor of Michigan: Kim Sigler (Republican)
 Lieutenant Governor of Michigan: Eugene C. Keyes (Republican) 
 Michigan Attorney General: Eugene F. Black (Republican) 
 Michigan Secretary of State: Frederick M. Alger Jr. (Republican) 
 Speaker of the Michigan House of Representatives: Victor A. Knox (Republican) 
 Chief Justice, Michigan Supreme Court:

Mayors of major cities
 Mayor of Detroit: Eugene Van Antwerp (Democrat)
 Mayor of Grand Rapids: George W. Welsh (Republican)
 Mayor of Flint: Edward J. Viall/George G. Wills
 Mayor of Saginaw: Harold J. Stenglein
 Mayor of Lansing: Ralph Crego

Federal office holders
 U.S. Senator from Michigan: Homer S. Ferguson (Republican)
 U.S. Senator from Michigan: Arthur Vandenberg (Republican) 
 House District 1: George G. Sadowski (Democrat)
 House District 2: Earl C. Michener (Republican)
 House District 3: Paul W. Shafer (Republican)
 House District 4: Clare Hoffman (Republican)
 House District 5: Bartel J. Jonkman (Republican)
 House District 6: William W. Blackney (Republican)
 House District 7: Jesse P. Wolcott (Republican)
 House District 8: Fred L. Crawford (Republican)
 House District 9: Albert J. Engel (Republican)
 House District 10: Roy O. Woodruff (Republican)
 House District 11: Charles E. Potter (Republican)
 House District 12: John B. Bennett (Republican)
 House District 13: Howard A. Coffin (Republican)
 House District 14: Harold F. Youngblood (Republican)
 House District 15: John D. Dingell Sr. (Democrat)
 House District 16: John Lesinski Sr. (Democrat)
 House District 17: George Anthony Dondero (Republican)

Population

Companies
The following is a list of major companies based in Michigan in 1948.

Sports

Baseball
 1948 Detroit Tigers season – 
 1948 Michigan Wolverines baseball season - Under head coach Ray Fisher, the Wolverines compiled a 21–6 record and tied for the Big Ten Conference championship. Jack Weisenburger was the team captain.

American football
 1948 Detroit Lions season –  
 1948 Michigan Wolverines football team – 
 1948 Michigan State Spartans football team – 
 1948 Detroit Titans football team –

Basketball
 1947–48 Michigan Wolverines men's basketball team –

Ice hockey
 1947–48 Detroit Red Wings season –

Boat racing
 APBA Gold Cup – 
 Harmsworth Cup –
 Port Huron to Mackinac Boat Race –

Boxing

Golfing
 Motor City Open - 
 Michigan Open -

Other

Chronology of events

Births
 April 2 - Tom Gage, sportswriter for The Detroit News (1979-2015) and 2015 recipient of the J. G. Taylor Spink Award, in Detroit
 June 16 - Ron LeFlore, Major League Baseball center fielder (1974-1982) whose life story was depicted in One in a Million: The Ron LeFlore Story, in Detroit
 September 29 - Mark Farner, singer, guitarist and songwriter, best known as the lead singer and lead guitarist for Grand Funk Railroad, in Flint, Michigan
 October 1 - Cub Koda, singer, guitarist, songwriter ("Smokin' in the Boys Room"), and music critic, in Detroit
 October 12 - John Engler, Governor of Michigan (1991-2003), in Pleasant Ridge, Michigan
 November 6 - Glenn Frey, singer, songwriter and actor, best known as a founding member of the rock band Eagles, in Detroit
 November 24 - Rudy Tomjanovich, professional basketball player (1970-1981) and 5× NBA All-Star, in Hamtramck, Michigan
 December 7 - Dennis M. Hertel, U.S. Congressman (1981-1993), in Detroit
 December 13 - Ted Nugent, musician and conservative political activistin Redford, Michigan
 December 27 - Edsel Ford II, great-grandson of Henry Ford a member of the board of directors of Ford Motor Company, in Detroit

Deaths

See also
 History of Michigan
 History of Detroit

References